was a retainer of the  Tokugawa clan following the later years of the Azuchi-Momoyama period of the 16th century.

Biography
Tadashige was the son of Mizuno Tadamasa and the brother of Mizuno Nobumoto.

He participated in the Battle of Mikatagahara in 1573 against Takeda Shingen.

In 1576, his brother, Nobumoto, was killed after betraying Tokugawa Ieyasu and later, he was given Kariya Castle.

In 1581, he led reinforcement troops from Oda clan at the second Siege of Takatenjin against Takeda clan.

In 1584, he participated in the Battle of Komaki and Nagakute against Toyotomi Hideyoshi.

In 1600, he was killed by Kaganoi Shigemochi on August 27 at Chiryu, Mikawa Province, a few days before the Battle of Sekigahara.

References

1541 births
1600 deaths
Place of birth unknown
Place of death unknown
Date of birth unknown